Alexander Stewart (born 1868, deceased) was a Scottish professional footballer who played as a wing half.

References
 

1868 births
Year of death missing
Footballers from Greenock
Scottish footballers
Association football wing halves
Greenock Morton F.C. players
Burnley F.C. players
Everton F.C. players
Nottingham Forest F.C. players
Notts County F.C. players
Northampton Town F.C. players
Leicester City F.C. players
English Football League players
Bedminster F.C. players
FA Cup Final players